Star polygons and polygonal compounds are the basis for numerous figures of significance in arts and culture. The figure may be the border or interior of the polygon, or one or more closed polygonal paths that include all of the border and also have some legs crossing the interior. The name is derived from the polygon's similarity to the diffraction spikes of astronomical stars, but specific uses may exploit the connection or not. Stars often represent the unity of states within a country when they are used as a part of the flag.

Emblematic use

In heraldry, a mullet is a star with straight arms and typically five points. A star with wavy rather than straight rays is called an estoile. The mullet, used as an heraldic charge, is the ensign of knightly rank, and every order of knighthood incorporates this symbol in some way. It has traditionally been used in British heraldry as a mark of cadency for the third son.
In Christian art, St. Bruno bears a star on his breast; Saint Dominic, Saint Humbert and Saint Peter of Alcantara have a star on their head or forehead.
The star with six (or less commonly five, sometimes seven) points is associated with law enforcement in the United States, and forms the basis of the sheriff's badge.

Five-pointed stars

The five-pointed star, if drawn with points of equal length and angles of 36° at each point, is sometimes termed a golden five pointed star. If the colinear edges are joined, a pentagram is produced, which is the simplest of the unicursal star polygons, and a symbol of mystical and magical significance.
The golden five-pointed star is a very common ideogram in the western world, and has particularly strong associations with military power and war. Many communist countries (such as China and Vietnam) and symbols (the hammer and sickle) also incorporate five-pointed stars.

The five-pointed star appears in the flags of 35 countries, and also appears commonly in the heraldry of the United States, and stands in contrast to the vexillologically rarer seven-pointed star.

The five-pointed star occurs in conjunction with a crescent in the flags of several countries to symbolize Islam, appearing for example as part of the symbol of the Ottoman Empire.

In philately, the five-pointed star signifies stamps that have not been postmarked.

The five-pointed star is used as the symbol of the People Nation alliance of gangs from Chicago. Blood gangs who originated from New York, known as the United Blood Nation, also use this as a symbol as they have emulated the People Nation alliance.

In the Armenian Pantheon, there is a goddess called Astlik/Astghik. In the Armenian language Astgh means star, Astghik - Little Star. Compared with Ishtar, Astara, this goddess' sign should have been the (probably)eight-pointed star.

Six-pointed stars
Several varieties of six-pointed stars are used in cultures around the world:
 If the collinear edges of a regular six-pointed star are connected, so that two interlaced triangles are formed, a symbol results that is variously known as the hexagram, Star of David, or Shield of David (Magen David). This symbol is most commonly associated with Judaism. It is also used in Christianity, Islam and Hinduism, but on a less frequent basis.
The Ahmadiyya flag, Lawa-e-Ahmaddiyat, contains a six-pointed star, adjacent to a crescent. 
 The Star of Life, which is a six-armed cross.
 The municipal flag of Chicago has four six-pointed stars.
 German and German-American hex signs and barn stars often incorporate both five- and six-pointed stars as central themes.
 The six-pointed star is used as the symbol for the Folk Nation alliance of gangs from Chicago. Crip gang members tend to use this symbol also.

Apart from the foresaid mentions, six-pointed star formations are rare as an ideograph in Western cultures except in the case of law enforcement badges. In astrology, some formations of a six-pointed star can signify fixed stars. In some rare instances, it can signify the date of birth on a gravestone, synonymous with the five-point star.

Seven-pointed stars

Political
A seven-pointed star appears in the flag and heraldic symbolism of Australia. In the Australian context, the seven points (also known as the Commonwealth Star, the Federation Star, the Seven Point Star, or the Star of Federation) is a seven-pointed star symbolising the Federation of Australia which came into force on 1 January 1901. Six points of the Star represent the six original states of the Commonwealth of Australia, while the seventh point represents the territories.

The seven-pointed stars stand in contrast to the vexillologically more conventional five-pointed stars.

The Seal of the Cherokee Nation has an acute gold seven-pointed star in its seal.

The seven-pointed star is also used as a symbol of the Trinitarios gang from New York City.

Heptagram

A heptagram or septagram is a seven-pointed star drawn with seven straight strokes. There are two kinds of heptagrams:
 Acute heptagram, the {7/3} star polygon.
 Obtuse heptagram, the {7/2} star polygon.

Eight-pointed stars

Political

Other 
The eight-pointed star is widely used in the Arabic states in decorative art,. It is sometimes similar star to the Star of Lakshmi formed from overlapping squares but may also appear in the form of the Rub el Hizb which adds a central circle to the design.

A two-color, 8-pointed star associated with the American Friends Service Committee and other Quaker service groups since the 1870s is sometimes called "the Quaker star".

Nine-pointed stars
A nine-pointed star is the most common symbol of the Baháʼí Faith, the number nine being significant in the religion.

Eleven-pointed stars
The flag of the Federation of Malaya used the eleven-pointed star from 1950 until 1963, with the star representing the 11 member states of the federation.

Twelve-pointed stars
The flag of Nauru uses a twelve-pointed star representing the 12 tribes on the island.

Fourteen-pointed stars
The flag of Malaysia uses the Federal Star, a fourteen-pointed star representing the unity between the 13 member states and the federal government.

See also
List of symbolic stars
Gallery of flags with stars
Star (glyph)

References
 
Graham, Dr. O.J. The Six-Pointed Star: Its Origin and Usage 4th ed.

External links 

 Moroccan Islamic Patterns: The Eight-Point Star Examining the symbolic meaning of the eight-point star (khatam) in Islamic ornamentation.

Heraldic charges
Pictograms
Topics in culture
Topics in the arts